Jinglongqiao Township is a rural township in Cili County, Zhangjiajie, Hunan Province, People's Republic of China.

Administrative division
The township is divided into 12 villages, the following areas: Jinglongqiao Village, Babuqiao Village, Tongzixiang Village, Daqing Village, Lianhe Village, Yangjiaya Village, Erxi Village, Xinfeng Village, Qingquan Village, Jingquan Village, Taiping Village, and Daxi Village (景龙桥村、八步桥村、桐子巷村、大清村、联合村、杨家垭村、二溪村、新丰村、清泉村、景泉村、太坪村、大溪村).

References

Former towns and townships of Cili County